John Ray Milem (born June 9, 1975 in Concord, North Carolina) is a former American football defensive end in the National Football League. He was drafted by the San Francisco 49ers in the fifth round of the 2000 NFL Draft. He played college football at Lenoir–Rhyne University.

References

Living people
1975 births
San Francisco 49ers players
Carolina Panthers players
American football defensive ends
Lenoir–Rhyne Bears football players
Lenoir–Rhyne University alumni